Michael D. Whinston is an American economist and currently the Sloan Fellows Professor at Massachusetts Institute of Technology. Previously he was the Robert E. and Emily H. King Professor at Northwestern University and is also a Fellow to the American Academy of Arts and Sciences and Econometric Society.

Education 
Whinston received a bachelors of science in economics and an MBA in finance from Wharton at the University of Pennsylvania. He then went on to receive a PhD in economics from MIT.

Personal life 
Whinston is married to political theorist and Brown University professor Bonnie Honig.

Honors 
Frisch Medal: awarded the Frisch Medal in 2015 for a paper he co-authored with Ben Handel and Igal Handel titled “Equilibria in Health Exchanges: Adverse Selection Versus Reclassification Risk.”

Distinguished Fellow: received the Industrial Organization Society Distinguished Fellow Award for his contributions and leadership in the field of Industrial Organization.

Robert F. Lanzilliotti Prize: won the 2014 Robert F. Lanzilliotti Prize for his paper “Internal Vs. External Growth in Industries with Scale Economies: A Computational Model of Optimal Merger Policy,” co-authored with Ben Mermelstein, Volker Nocke, and Mark Satterthwaite. The award is given to the best paper in antitrust economics.

References

Living people
MIT School of Humanities, Arts, and Social Sciences faculty
21st-century American economists
Wharton School of the University of Pennsylvania alumni
MIT School of Humanities, Arts, and Social Sciences alumni
Fellows of the American Academy of Arts and Sciences
1959 births
Fellows of the Econometric Society